Greece national under-23 football team represents Greece in international football competitions in Olympic Games. The selection is limited to players under the age of 23, except three overaged players. The team is controlled by the Hellenic Football Federation (HFF).

Summer Olympics

Players

Olympic Squads

1920 Summer Olympics
Head coach:  Georgios Kalafatis

1952 Summer Olympics
Head coach:  Antonis Migiakis

2004 Summer Olympics
Head coach:  Stratos Apostolakis

* Overage player.<noinclude>

Overage players in Olympic Games

Olympic match record

Goalscorers

Other appearances
1906 Intercalated Games squads – Greece

Mediterranean Games

See also
Greece national football team
Greece national under-21 football team
Greece national under-20 football team
Greece national under-19 football team
Greece national under-17 football team

External links
 Εθνική U-23
 Rec.Sport.Soccer Statistics Foundation - 1906 Summer Olympics
 FIFA: Men's Olympic Football Tournament 2004
 :el:%CE%9F%CE%BB%CF%85%CE%BC%CF%80%CE%B9%CE%B1%CE%BA%CE%AE %CE%95%CE%B8%CE%BD%CE%B9%CE%BA%CE%AE %CE%BF%CE%BC%CE%AC%CE%B4%CE%B1 %CE%95%CE%BB%CE%BB%CE%AC%CE%B4%CE%B1%CF%82 (%CF%80%CE%BF%CE%B4%CF%8C%CF%83%CF%86%CE%B1%CE%B9%CF%81%CE%BF)

European national under-23 association football teams
Football in Greece
Foot